The 1807 United Kingdom general election was the third general election to be held after the Union of Great Britain and Ireland.

The third United Kingdom Parliament was dissolved on 29 April 1807. The new Parliament was summoned to meet on 22 June 1807, for a maximum seven-year term from that date. The maximum term could be and normally was curtailed, by the monarch dissolving the Parliament, before its term expired.

Political situation
Following the 1806 election the Ministry of all the Talents, a coalition of the Foxite and Grenvillite Whig and Addingtonite Tory factions, with William Grenville, 1st Baron Grenville, as Prime Minister continued in office. It had attempted to end the Napoleonic Wars by negotiation. As this hope failed the war continued.

The faction formerly led by William Pitt the Younger, before his death in January 1806, were the major group in opposition to the Talents' Ministry. George Canning in the House of Commons and the Duke of Portland in the House of Lords were at the head of this opposition.

Grenville and his cabinet lost the support of King George III by trying to legislate to permit Roman Catholics to serve as Army and Navy officers. When ministers refused to give the King written confirmation that they would not raise the Catholic issue again, he decided to find new servants.

The elderly Duke of Portland was asked to form a new ministry in March 1807. Portland had been the Whig Prime Minister before, in the 1780s, so now he described himself as the Whig Prime Minister of a Tory ministry.

After Pitt's death the younger Pittites increasingly began calling themselves the Tory Party, whether they had previously belonged to the Whig or Tory tradition. This was an important stage in the development of a more organised two-party system, which reduced the influence of factions and connections in British politics.

The new ministers found it difficult to manage a House of Commons recently elected to support their opponents. A month into the new government the King granted a dissolution.

The government policies of opposing Catholic relief and supporting the traditional powers of the King proved popular (at least with the restricted section of the population enfranchised in elections for the unreformed House of Commons). After the election the government programme was approved by a vote of 350 to 155 in the House of Commons, demonstrating the substantial gains ministers had made in the election.

Dates of election
At this period there was not one election day. After receiving a writ (a royal command) for the election to be held, the local returning officer fixed the election timetable for the particular constituency or constituencies he was concerned with. Polling in seats with contested elections could continue for many days.

The time between the first and last contested elections was 4 May to 9 June 1807.

Results

Seats summary

Summary of the constituencies

Monmouthshire (1 County constituency with 2 MPs and one single member Borough constituency) is included in Wales in these tables. Sources for this period may include the county in England.

Table 1: Constituencies and MPs, by type and country

Table 2: Number of seats per constituency, by type and country

See also
 United Kingdom general elections

References
 His Majesty's Opposition 1714–1830, by Archibald S. Foord (Oxford University Press 1964)
 (Dates of Elections) Footnote to Table 5.02 British Electoral Facts 1832–1999, compiled and edited by Colin Rallings and Michael Thrasher (Ashgate Publishing Ltd 2000).
 (Types of constituencies – Great Britain) British Historical Facts 1760–1830, by Chris Cook and John Stevenson (The Macmillan Press 1980).
 (Types of constituencies – Ireland) Parliamentary Election Results in Ireland 1801–1922, edited by B.M. Walker (Royal Irish Academy 1978).

 
1807 elections in the United Kingdom
General election
1807
May 1807 events
June 1807 events
1800s elections in Ireland